Bottino is a surname. Notable people with the surname include:

Cecilia Bottino, Uruguayan lawyer and politician
Filippo Bottino (1888–1969), Italian heavyweight weightlifter
Louis Bottino (1907–1979), American educator and politician
Nestor Bottino (born 1955), Argentine-born American architect